Events from the year 1787 in Denmark.

Incumbents
 Monarch – Christian VII
 Prime minister – Andreas Peter Bernstorff

Events

 1517 July  Students and soldiers fight in Filosofgangen in Copenhagen ("Studenterkrigen i Filosofgangen")).

Undated

 J. Cl. Todes Døtreskole, the first serious school for girls, is founded.
 English: A controversy between the historian Jens Kragh Høst  (1772-1844) and Jacob  Baden (1735-1840) and art historian Torkel Baden (1765-1849) attractys attention..

Births
 29 June  Broder Knud Brodersen Wigelsen, nval officer (died 1867)
 4 September – Jørgen Hansen Koch, architect (died 1860)
 6 September – Christian Waagepetersen, wine merchant and philanthropist (died 1840)
 22 November – Rasmus Rask, scholar and philologist (died 1832)

Deta unknown
 Johannes Flintoe, painter of landscapes and scenes from Scandinavian history (died 1870)

Deaths
 27 December  Henrik Gerner, naval officer and shipbuilder (born 1742)

Full date missing
 Anna Sofie Bülow, courtier  (born 1745)

References

 
1780s in Denmark
Denmark
Years of the 18th century in Denmark